Monimon De Louis Florian Yonsian (born 25 November 2000) is an Ivorian footballer who plays for Ashton United as a forward.

Career history

Rochdale
Yonsian started his career with Rochdale joining the club as a 14 year old. In the summer of 2017 he was one of a number of players who signed a two year full time scholarship. He made his first-team debut for the club on 7 November 2018 in a Football League Trophy tie against the under-21 team of Leicester City. He went on to make two more appearances in the competition, one against Oldham Athletic, and third against the under-21 team of Manchester City.  At the end of the season he was released, having not been offered a professional contract by the club.

Salford City
In July 2019 he signed for Salford City. In December 2019 he joined Stafford Rangers on loan and made his debut for the club the following day.

In January 2020 he joined Marine on loan, playing four league games for them before returning to Salford.

Trafford
In the summer of 2020 he played for Trafford in various pre-season games before joining the club in September.

Stalybridge Celtic
In May 2021 he signed for Stalybridge Celticbut did not play a competitive game for the club and left in July.

Ashton United
In October he signed for Ashton United.=

Career statistics

References

Ivorian footballers
2000 births
Living people
Association football forwards
Rochdale A.F.C. players
Salford City F.C. players
Stafford Rangers F.C. players
Marine F.C. players
Trafford F.C. players
Stalybridge Celtic F.C. players
Ashton United F.C. players